The Sher-e-Bangla National Cricket Stadium, also known as the Mirpur Stadium, is a sports ground in Dhaka, the capital city of Bangladesh. The ground has hosted 177 international cricket matches since 2006. On 17 January 2018 during the 2017–18 Bangladesh Tri-Nation Series, it became the sixth and the fastest to host 100 ODIs. It is named after A. K. Fazlul Huq, the first Prime Minister of Bengal, who was accorded the title Sher-e-Bangla ("The Tiger of Bengal"). The venue was taken over by the Bangladesh Cricket Board in 2004, replacing the Bangabandhu National Stadium as the home of both the men's and women's national teams. The first international match on the ground, a One Day International (ODI), was played between Bangladesh and Zimbabwe in 2006, with the first Test match played the following year between Bangladesh and India in 2000. The first Twenty20 International (T20I) match on the ground was played between Bangladesh and West Indies in 2011. Women's One Day International and Twenty20 International cricket have also been played on the ground.

In cricket, a century is a score of 100 or more runs in a single innings by a batter. A century is regarded as a landmark score for batters and a player's number of centuries is generally recorded in their career statistics. 

The first batsman to score a century in Test cricket at Mirpur was Dinesh Karthik of India against Bangladesh during the ground's debut Test match on 25 May 2007. Gautam Gambhir was the first batsman to score a century in ODI cricket on this ground, scoring 101 runs off 113 balls. Mohammad Ashraful was the first Bangladeshi batsman to score a century at the ground, scoring 101 off 193 balls against Sri Lanka in December 2008. Tamim Iqbal was the first batsman among Bangladeshis to score a century in an ODI match on this ground, scoring 129 runs off 136 balls against Ireland on 22 March 2008, being the youngest player to do so on this ground. Iqbal has scored a total of seven international centuries on this ground, two in Tests and five in ODIs - the most by any player on this ground. The only centurion in this ground in T20Is is Ahmed Shehzad, who scored 111 runs off just 62 balls against Bangladesh in March 2014.
Azhar Ali of Pakistan is the highest individual run scorer in Tests on this ground, scoring 226 runs off 428 balls against Bangladesh on 6 May 2015. Shane Watson's 185 runs off just 96 balls against Bangladesh in 2011 is the highest individual score by a batsman on this ground in ODI.  

In the 3rd ODI between Bangladesh and Sri Lanka in May 2021, Kusal Perera of Sri Lanka scored 120 runs, which was the 50th One Day International century at this venue.

Key 

 * denotes that the batsman was not out.
 Inns. denotes the number of the innings in the match.
 Balls denotes the number of balls faced in an innings.
 The column title Date refers to the date the match started. 
The column title Result refers to the result of the match.

List of Test centuries 

As of 27 May 2022, A total of 43 Test centuries have been scored at this ground.

List of One Day International centuries 

There have been 53 ODI centuries scored on this ground.

List of Twenty20 International centuries 

Only one Twenty20 International century has been scored at the stadium.

See also
 Sher-e-Bangla National Cricket Stadium
 List of international cricket five-wicket hauls at the Sher-e-Bangla National Cricket Stadium

References 

Sher-e-Bangla National Cricket Stadium
Bangladeshi cricket lists
Cricket in Bangladesh
Lists of Bangladesh cricket records and statistics